Otomeria is a genus of flowering plants belonging to the family Rubiaceae.

Its native range is Tropical Africa.

Species
Species:

Otomeria cameronica 
Otomeria elatior 
Otomeria guineensis 
Otomeria lanceolata 
Otomeria madiensis 
Otomeria micrantha 
Otomeria oculata 
Otomeria volubilis

References

Rubiaceae
Rubiaceae genera